Groot Aub is a settlement located approximately  south of Windhoek, in the Khomas Region of Namibia. It belongs to the Windhoek Rural electoral constituency and houses its constituency office. In September 2017 Groot Aub was incorporated into the capital Windhoek.

Groot Aub is a poor community which consists of about 6,000 inhabitants of which most are small-scale farmers and pensioners. Having access to this land is the primary source of livelihood for the people in this community.

Groot Aub has experienced major development in the last few years. The village seems to be growing rapidly, and already has a school, a clinic and a police station. While at first there was no electricity and a shortage of water, the Khomas Regional Council started a project in 2004 to ensure an uninterrupted supply of water by laying underground pipelines in the Groot Aub community, thus providing water at all points. With the 2017 incorporation into Windhoek, however, tap water will no longer be free of charge.

Groot Aub is home to the Groot Aub Junior Secondary School, one of the 3 pilot schools in the NETA Project, as well as being one of the few Namibian partners in the Discovery Channel's Project. Six teachers were selected from this school in 2004 to participate in the NETA training program.

References

Populated places in the Khomas Region
Suburbs of Windhoek